Snowman were a band originally from Perth, Western Australia. They formed in 2002, relocated to London in 2008, and disbanded in 2011.

History

2002-2005: Formation and Zombies on the Airwaves of Paris
Snowman began playing together in various incarnations and under different names during their high school years. Joe McKee and Andy Citawarman met when they were fourteen years old; they began writing music together almost immediately. Olga Hermanniusson soon joined on Bass guitar and saxophone.  After a few line-up and name changes, the band settled on Snowman with new drummer Ross DiBlasio joining in 2002. In 2003 they began playing live around Australia. They also recorded two demo CDs, which included early versions of "Lost in the Woods", "The Horror Song", "Moodswing" and a track that would go through many changes to eventually become "Wormwood".

In 2003, the band won The Next Big Thing competition and began recording an EP later that year. Zombies on the Airwaves of Paris was released in September 2004 and distributed by Shock Records in Australia. It garnered positive reviews nationally. National tours with Interpol, Regurgitator, The Mint Chicks and Wolfmother soon followed, as well as a publishing deal with Mushroom Music Publishing.

In 2005 the band were nominated for six WAMi Awards, winning the Favourite Newcomer award.

2006-2011: Studio albums, awards and break up
In 2006, the band signed with Melbourne-based indie label Dot Dash Records and began recording their self-titled debut album with Perth Producer David Parkin at Blackbird Studios. Snowman was released on 23 September 2006 to positive reviews. They toured Australia extensively in the year that followed, playing the national Big Day Out tour, Meredith Music Festival, Laneway Festivals, and supported Liars, Wolf & Cub and The Drones on their respective national tours.

In 2006 the band were nominated for two WAMi Awards: with Citawarman winning the Best Male Vocalist Award.

At the 2007 WAMi Awards, Snowman won three WAMI awards for Most Popular Album' (Snowman), 'Most Popular Music Video' ("You Are A Casino") and 'Best Rock Act'.

"You Are a Casino" was released as a limited 7" single in the UK on 25 June 2007 on the Passport Label, through Forte Distribution

In January 2008, Snowman announced that they were recording their second album with David Parkin. The Horse, The Rat and The Swan was released on 24 May 2008. It received critical acclaim throughout Australia, polling at number one on the Mess and Noise end of year critic's poll.
and receiving a positive review and honorable mention in Pitchfork's end of year poll.

In late 2008, Snowman relocated to London, England. The next two years saw Snowman write a new record with Australian producer Aaron Cupples.

On 23 November 2010, Snowman announced the title, Absence, and track listing of their upcoming album. The album was released on 3 June 2011. Upon its release Snowman formally announced that they had split up.

Band members
 Andy Citawarman (b. Indonesia, 1984) – guitar/vocals/violin/keys
 Joe McKee (b. England, 1984) – guitar/vocals/gammalan
 Olga Hermanniusson (b. Australia, 1983) – bass/vocals/saxophone
 Ross DiBlasio (b. Australia 1985) – drums/percussion

Discography
Albums

Extended plays

Awards
West Australian Music Industry Awards
The West Australian Music Industry Awards are annual awards celebrating achievements for Western Australian music. They commenced in 1985.
 
 (wins only)
|-
| 2005
| Snowman
| Favourite Newcomer 
| 
|-
| 2006
| Andy Citawarman (Snowman)
| Best Male Vocalist
| 
|-
| rowspan="3"| 2007
| "You Are a Casino"
| Most Popular Music Video
| 
|-
| Snowman''
| Most Popular Album
| 
|-
| Snowman
| Best Rock Act
| 
|-

References

Australian indie rock groups
Western Australian musical groups
Musical groups established in 2002
Musical groups disestablished in 2011